Acqua pazza may refer to:

 Acqua pazza (food), a dish of poached white fish and tomatoes in Italian cuisine  
 Acqua pazza (wine), a type of wine made by Mezzadria peasants in Italy